Scrobipalpa zaitzevi is a moth in the family Gelechiidae. It was described by Piskunov in 1990. It is found in Mongolia.

References

Scrobipalpa
Moths described in 1990